Udinese Calcio sensationally finished third in Serie A, much due to Oliver Bierhoff being in the form of his life, scoring 27 goals in a league season consisting of just 34 matches. Bierhoff, coach Alberto Zaccheroni and winger Thomas Helveg all left for Milan at the end of the season, ensuring Udinese had much work to do to maintain its level.

Squad

Transfers

Winter

Competitions

Serie A

Results by round

Matches

Statistics

Players statistics

Topscorers
  Oliver Bierhoff 27
  Paolo Poggi 10
  Márcio Amoroso 5
  Alessandro Calori 3
  Tomas Locatelli 3

References

Sources
  RSSSF – Italy 1997/98

Udinese Calcio seasons
Udinese